Michal Murček (born 29 January 1992) is a Slovak professional ice hockey player currently playing for HK Martin of the Slovak 1. Liga.

Career statistics

Regular season and playoffs

International

References

External links
 

Living people
MHC Martin players
HK Poprad players
Slovak ice hockey forwards
1992 births
MHk 32 Liptovský Mikuláš players
HC 07 Detva players
HC Košice players
HKM Zvolen players
Nacka HK players
MHK Dolný Kubín players
Sportspeople from Martin, Slovakia
Slovak expatriate sportspeople in Norway
Expatriate ice hockey players in Norway
Slovak expatriate ice hockey players in Sweden